Kullyarovo (Küllär) is a rural locality (a village) in Yefremkinsky Selsoviet, Karmaskalinsky District, Bashkortostan, Russia. The population was 148 as of 2010. There are 3 streets.

Geography 
Kullyarovo is located 13 km southeast of Karmaskaly (the district's administrative centre) by road. Mukayevo is the nearest rural locality.

References 

Rural localities in Karmaskalinsky District
Ufa Governorate